"Y'all Come Back Saloon" is a song written by Sharon Vaughn, and recorded by American country music group The Oak Ridge Boys.  It was released in July 1977 as the first single and title track from the album Y'all Come Back Saloon.  The song reached number 3 on the Billboard Hot Country Singles & Tracks chart.

Charts

Weekly charts

Year-end charts

References

1977 singles
The Oak Ridge Boys songs
Songs written by Sharon Vaughn
Song recordings produced by Ron Chancey
Dot Records singles
1977 songs